The List of Graphemes of Commonly-Used Chinese Characters is a list of 4762 commonly used Chinese characters and their standardized forms prescribed by the Hong Kong Education Bureau. The list is meant to be taught in primary and middle schools in Hong Kong, but does not place restrictions on typefaces used for printing such as Ming, gothic, or rounded gothic typeface styles.

History  
Research and compilation work on the List began in July 1984. The work was undertaken by Professor Lei Hok-ming of the Department of Chinese of the Education Bureau Institute of Language in Education (ILE) and other scholars within the department. A Committee for the Research of Commonly-Used Chinese Character Graphemes, composed of scholars from various academic institutions, also participated in the examination and approval process for each character. The List was completed in September 1985 and published in September 1986. 

The list was revised more thoroughly upon republications in 1990, 1997, and 2000. The 1990 revision was undertaken by three professors in the Chinese department of the ILE. In 2000, the ILE had become a part of the Education University of Hong Kong, so the editing process was undertaken by three professors (Ze Gaa-hou , Lou Hing-kiu , and Sitou Sau-mei ) of the Education University, along with Lei Hok-ming, who was at Hong Kong Polytechnic University at the time.

The list was last updated in 2007, included as an appendix to the Hong Kong Chinese Lexical Lists for Primary Learning. 

In 2012, the list was published as a hardcover book, with Cantonese and Mandarin pronunciations and simple English explanations for every character.

References
 http://crc.edb.gov.hk/crchome/en/26.asp

External links
 Lexical Lists for Chinese Learning in Hong Kong

Chinese characters